Grevillea patentiloba is a species of flowering plant in the family Proteaceae and is endemic to the south-west of Western Australia. It is a prostrate to erect, spreading to straggling shrub with divided leaves, and down-turned clusters of red to deep pink and cream-coloured to bright yellow flowers with a red to deep pink style.

Description
The edges of the lobes are turned down or rolled under, enclosing most of the lower surface. The flowers are red to deep pink and cream-coloured to bright yellow, the style red to deep pink.

Taxonomy
Grevillea patentiloba was first formally described in 1859 by Ferdinand von Mueller in Fragmenta Phytographiae Australiae. The specific epithet (patentiloba) means "spreading-lobed", referring to the leaves.

In 1994, Peter Olde and Neil Marriott described two subspecies of G. patentiloba in The Grevillea Book, and the names are accepted by the Australian Plant Census:
 Grevillea patentiloba subsp. platypoda (F.Muell.)

Distribution and habitat
Subspecies patentiloba grows in heath and scrubby woodland from near Lake King to Hopetoun and near Ravensthorpe in the Esperance Plains and Mallee bioregions of south-western Western Australia and subspecies platyloba grows in open woodland and shrubland in the Ravensthorpe area in the Esperance Plains bioregion.

Conservation status
Both subspecies of G. patentiloba are listed as "not threatened" by the Government of Western Australia Department of Biodiversity, Conservation and Attractions.

See also
 List of Grevillea species

References

patentiloba
Endemic flora of Western Australia
Eudicots of Western Australia
Proteales of Australia
Taxa named by Ferdinand von Mueller
Plants described in 1859